Ancyluris formosissima is a butterfly of the family Riodinidae.

Description
The upper sides of the forewings are dark brown with a blue-green band, while the base is white and brown. The hind wings are white, pink and brown, with  a brilliant blue-green marginal band and a small red area. At the edge of the hind wings there is a short tail. In South America, this butterfly is called a "living treasure" (the Latin name formosissima of this species, means “very beautiful”) and it is also called the Italian flag butterfly. It flies in August and September.

Distribution
This species is present in tropical rainforests forests of South America, mainly in Ecuador, Peru and Bolivia.

Subspecies
 Ancyluris formosissima formosissima (Hewitson, 1870) (Ecuador)
 Ancyluris formosissima venerabilis Stichel, 1916 (Peru)

References
 Funet
 Lepidopterolog.ru

External links
 Butterflies of Sangay National Park
 Biolib
 A. formosissima venerabilis

Riodinini
Butterflies described in 1870
Riodinidae of South America
Taxa named by William Chapman Hewitson